The 1954 European Rowing Championships were rowing championships held on the Bosbaan regatta course in the Dutch city of Amsterdam. This edition is particularly notable for the fact that it was the first time that women were allowed to compete as part of the championships, after three years of trial regattas for them. Women from 13 countries were represented with 34 boats, and they competed in five boat classes (W1x, W2x, W4x+, W4+, W8+) from 20 to 22 August. The men competed in all seven Olympic boat classes (M1x, M2x, M2-, M2+, M4-, M4+, M8+) a week later, from 26 to 29 August. It would be another 22 years until women would first be allowed to compete at Olympic level in 1976.

Medal summary – women's events
For the 1954 regatta, the Bosbaan was widened from five lanes to six. All of the boat classes had single-digit entries (five crews each for the eight and quad, and nine for the singles), just four of the lanes were used in the races so that there were heats, repêchages, and a final.

Medal summary – men's events

References

European Rowing Championships
European
Rowing
Sports competitions in Amsterdam
European Rowing Championships
Rowing